Mette Tranborg (born 1 January 1996) is a Danish handball player for Team Esbjerg and the Danish national team.

Achievements

Domestic competitions
Danish Championship:
Silver Medalist: 2018
Danish Cup:
Runners-up: 2018

Individual awards
 MVP of the Danish Handball Cup: 2018
 Youth player of the Year in Damehåndboldligaen: 2014/15

References

External links

1996 births
Living people
Sportspeople from Aarhus
Danish female handball players